Lula is a city in Hall and Banks counties in the U.S. state of Georgia. Most of the city is in Hall County, with a small eastern portion of the city located in Banks County. The population was 2,758 at the 2010 census. The Hall County portion of Lula is part of the Gainesville, GA Metropolitan Statistical Area. Lula is the home of RailRoad Days, a yearly festival held usually every May. 
Lula is the railroad junction between the Atlanta northeast line and the Athens north line of Norfolk Southern Railway.

Major roads near Lula are Georgia Highway 51, Georgia Highway 52, Georgia Highway 365, U.S. Route 23, and old US 23.

Geography

Lula is located at  (34.389746, -83.664270).

Demographics

2020 census

As of the 2020 United States census, there were 2,822 people, 1,012 households, and 724 families residing in the city.

2000 census
As of the census of 2000, there were 1,438 people, 531 households, and 399 families residing in the city. The racial makeup of the city was 89.71% White, 8.14% African American, 0.42% Asian, 0.07% Pacific Islander, 1.25% from other races, and 0.42% from two or more races. Hispanic or Latino of any race were 2.23% of the population.

There were 531 households, out of which 39.5% had children under the age of 18 living with them, 59.5% were married couples living together, 12.4% had a female householder with no husband present, and 24.7% were non-families. 20.5% of all households were made up of individuals, and 10.2% had someone living alone who was 65 years of age or older.  The average household size was 2.71 and the average family size was 3.13.

In the city, the population was spread out, with 28.0% under the age of 18, 8.9% from 18 to 24, 31.6% from 25 to 44, 21.1% from 45 to 64, and 10.4% who were 65 years of age or older.  The median age was 34 years. For every 100 females, there were 92.5 males.  For every 100 females age 18 and over, there were 89.2 males.

The median income for a household in the city was $36,741, and the median income for a family was $43,667. Males had a median income of $30,195 versus $23,750 for females. The per capita income for the city was $15,246.  About 7.5% of families and 11.5% of the population were below the poverty line, including 14.0% of those under age 18 and 17.9% of those age 65 or over.

History
The rail spur from Athens to Lula was completed in 1874 for the North Eastern Railroad. Civil engineers Joel Hurt and his brother Fletcher named the town in honor of Miss Lula Phinizy, later Mrs. Abner W. Calhoun, whom they both admired.

The Georgia General Assembly incorporated Lula as a town in 1905.

References

External links
City of Lula, Georgia Official Website
Lula Downtown Development Authority

Cities in Georgia (U.S. state)
Cities in Banks County, Georgia
Cities in Hall County, Georgia